The  is a limited express train service operated by the West Japan Railway Company (JR West) between  and  in Japan via the Hokuriku Main Line since 14 March 2015.

Service outline

The name is a portmanteau derived from the English words "dinosaur" for which Fukui is famous and "star".

Rolling stock
The services use the 681 series and 683 series EMUs used on Thunderbird services.

Formations
Trains are normally formed as shown below, with car 1 at the Kanazawa (eastern) end. All cars are no-smoking.

From the start of the revised timetable introduced on 26 March 2016, some services (Dinostar 1 and 6) will operate as three-car formations with no Green car.

History
The name of the new train services was officially announced by JR West's Kanazawa Division on 7 October 2014.

See also
 List of named passenger trains of Japan

References

External links

 JR West press release (October 2014) 
 Service outline 

Named passenger trains of Japan
Railway services introduced in 2015
West Japan Railway Company
2015 establishments in Japan